Herat District is a district of Herat Province, Afghanistan.  The capital lies at Herat city. In 2019 the estimated population was 556,205.

References

External links

Districts of Herat Province